Hanste Khelte is a 1984 Indian Hindi-language film directed by Dayanand, starring Mithun Chakraborty, Rakesh Roshan, Zarina Wahab, Raza Murad and Vijayendra Ghatge.

Plot

Hanste Khelte is a murder mystery starring Mithun Chakraborty and Rakesh Roshan, well supported by Zarina Wahab, Raza Murad and Vijayendra Ghatge. Mithun (Mithun Chakraborty), Rakesh (Rakesh Roshan), and Vijay (Vijayendra Ghatge) are more interested in college political issues than their studies, which entangles them in a murder mystery.

Cast

 Mithun Chakraborty 
 Rakesh Roshan 
 Zarina Wahab 
 Raza Murad 
 Vijayendra Ghatge
 Jagdeep
 Keshto Mukherjee
 Iftekhar
 Shriram Lagoo
 Datta Bhat
 Asha Sachdev
 Asit Sen

Soundtrack
"Arre Pyaar Kiya Hai Karenge" - Kishore Kumar, Sulakshana Pandit
"Hai Jung Ki Raat Yehi" - Bhupinder Singh
"Hanste Khelte Hanste Khelte" - Kishore Kumar, Amit Kumar, Suresh Wadkar, Bhupinder Singh, Usha Mangeshkar
"Itna Bhi Mann Aazaad" - Bhupinder Singh
"Pyaar Ho Gaya Hai Dil Kho Gaya Hai" - Sulakshana Pandit
"Pyaar Kiya Hai Karenge Saath Jiyenge Marenge" - Kusum Chauhan

References

External links
 
http://ibosnetwork.com/asp/filmbodetails.asp?id=Hanste+Khelte

1984 films
1980s Hindi-language films
Indian action films
1984 action films